Mutiny on the Amistad: The Saga of a Slave Revolt and Its Impact on American Abolition, Law, and Diplomacy (1987) is a history of a notable slave mutiny of 1839 and its aftermath, written by professor Howard Jones.

The book explores the events surrounding the slave mutiny on the Spanish schooner La Amistad in 1839. The ship was taken into United States custody off the south coast of Long Island, New York. The book discusses the roles and international dynamics of the case, involving Spain, England, and the United States as they related to the 19th-century slave trade.  It examines United States v. The Amistad Africans 40 U.S. (15 Pet.) 518 (1841), the United States Supreme Court case that adjudicated the property issues and ultimately the fate of the Mende people who were held captive on Amistad and the ownership of the vessel.

Reception
In his review published in Civil War History, Dudley T. Cornish noted that in 1965, the historian Samuel Eliot Morison described the Amistad case of 1839 as "the most famous involving slavery," until it was "eclipsed by the Dred Scott decision." Cornish wrote that Jones' work was "a careful, comprehensive study" that should make it easy to restore references to the case in textbooks, where it had been overlooked in the prior decade.

Legacy 
The 1997 film Amistad, directed by Steven Spielberg, is based on this book, including the Supreme Court case. It stars Anthony Hopkins as John Quincy Adams, Morgan Freeman as an American abolitionist, Djimon Hounsou as Cinqué, leader of the slaves; and Matthew McConaughey as Roger Sherman Baldwin, the lawyer to the Mende captives.

See also 
United States v. The Amistad
 Abolitionism in the United States
 Amistad film
 John Quincy Adams and abolitionism

References 

"Review: Mutiny on the Amistad: "All We Want is Make Us Free"", first printed in Connecticut Scholar, available at Amistad, Mystic Seaport

Non-fiction books about American slavery
La Amistad
1987 non-fiction books
Non-fiction books adapted into films